In functional analysis, a branch of mathematics, the Goldstine theorem, named after Herman Goldstine, is stated as follows:

Goldstine theorem. Let  be a Banach space, then the image of the closed unit ball  under the canonical embedding into the closed unit ball  of the bidual space  is a weak*-dense subset.

The conclusion of the theorem is not true for the norm topology, which can be seen by considering the Banach space  of real sequences that converge to zero, c0 space  and its bi-dual space Lp space

Proof

Lemma 

For all   and  there exists an  such that  for all

Proof of lemma 

By the surjectivity of

Now let

Every element of  satisfies  and  so it suffices to show that the intersection is nonempty.

Assume for contradiction that it is empty. Then  and by the Hahn–Banach theorem there exists a linear form  such that  and  Then  and therefore

which is a contradiction.

Proof of theorem 

Fix   and  Examine the set

Let  be the embedding defined by  where  is the evaluation at  map. Sets of the form  form a base for the weak* topology, so density follows once it is shown  for all such  The lemma above says that for any  there exists a  such that   and in particular   Since  we have  We can scale to get  The goal is to show that for a sufficiently small  we have 

Directly checking, one has

Note that one can choose  sufficiently large so that  for  Note as well that  If one chooses  so that  then

Hence one gets  as desired.

See also

References 

  

Banach spaces
Theorems in functional analysis

de:Schwach-*-Topologie#Eigenschaften